The Chair in the Doorway is the fifth studio album by Living Colour, which was released on September 15, 2009. It is their first studio album since the release of Collideøscope in 2003, and their first release on Megaforce Records. The album met generally positive reviews and sold about 2,800 copies in its first week landing at #161 on the Billboard 200. This is their first album to chart since Stain in 1993.

"Bless Those (Little Annie's Prayer)", which was co-written by Annie Bandez and Doug Wimbish, was originally recorded and released on Little Annie's 1992 album Short and Sweet.  Mark Stewart included a version of the song "Method" on his 2012 album The Politics of Envy.

Track listing

Personnel
Living Colour
 Corey Glover – lead and backing vocals
 Vernon Reid – guitars, electronic guitar, acoustic guitar, laptop, sound design and backing vocals on "That's What You Taught Me"
 Doug Wimbish – bass, ambience, guitars, beats vocals
 Will Calhoun – drums, percussion; wave drum, toy piano, keyboards, backing vocals on "Not Tomorrow"
Additional musicians
 Becca de Beauport – keyboards on "That's What You Taught Me" and vocals on "Not Tomorrow"

Charts

References

2009 albums
Living Colour albums
Megaforce Records albums